Lake City is the county seat of Columbia County, Florida, United States. As of the 2020 census, the city's population was 12,329. It is the principal city of the Lake City Micropolitan Statistical Area, which is composed of Columbia County, and had a 2010 population of 67,531. Lake City is 60 miles west of Jacksonville.

Lake City began as the town of Alligator in 1821 near the Seminole settlement known as Alligator Village. Alligator became the seat of Columbia County in 1832 when it was formed from Duval and Alachua counties. In 1858 Alligator was incorporated and renamed Lake City. The Battle of Olustee, the largest American Civil War battle in Florida, took place near Lake City in 1864. In 1884 the Florida Agricultural College was established in Lake City as a land grant college; it was relocated to Gainesville in 1905 to form part of the University of Florida. The city's sesquicentennial was held in 2009.

Lake City is known as "The Gateway to Florida" because it is adjacent to the intersection of Interstate 75 and Interstate 10. The city is the site of Lake City Gateway Airport, formerly known as NAS Lake City. Florida Gateway College is located in Lake City.

History

Timucua and Spanish Florida

In 1539 Hernando de Soto and his Spanish expedition arrived in Tampa Bay. The de Soto expedition proceeded north from Tampa Bay looking for gold. His expedition met a large Native American group called the northern Utina, possibly near present-day Lake City, who were part of the western Timucua people. Some northern Utina were led by powerful chiefs. In the 17th century Spanish missionaries established missions in this area, west of the site of present-day Lake City. Called Santa Cruz de Tarihica, it was used by the Spanish to develop agriculture and bring Native Americans within their sphere.

Alligator

In the 18th century, a Seminole community called Alligator Village (Alpata Telophka) occupied this area. Historians do not know when it was established, but its existence was documented by the U.S. Army in 1821. A February 1821 report by Captain John H. Bell mentions that the mico (chief) of Alligator Village had recently died and missed a gathering of chiefs. The most famous resident of Alligator Village was Alligator Warrior (Halpatter Tustenuggee), also known as Chief Alligator. He was the grandson of Micanopy (King) Payne (Mekk-Onvpv Pin) and led Seminole warriors in the Second Seminole War (1835–1842) to resist their people's relocation to the Arkansas Territory (now known as Oklahoma).

After Florida became a territory of the United States in 1821, pioneer and immigrant settlers from the United States formed their own settlement adjacent to Alligator Village and called it Alligator. Following the 1823 Treaty of Moultrie Creek, the residents of Alligator village relocated to the banks of Peace Creek in the newly established Seminole reservation, leaving Alligator Town on its own. When Columbia County was formed in 1832 from Duval and Alachua counties, Alligator Town was designated as the seat of the county government.

During the Seminole Wars, several forts were established in the area, including Fort White on the Santa Fe River, and Fort Alligator, also called Fort Lancaster, in present-day downtown Lake City. By 1845 the last of the Seminole left the area of present-day Lake City or were forcibly removed by the US Army. In 1847 Company C of the Florida Volunteers, which was composed of Lake City members, served in the Mexican–American War.

In November 1858 a railroad was completed connecting Jacksonville to Alligator, which opened the town to more commerce and passenger traffic. Alligator Town was incorporated and its name changed to Lake City in 1859; M. Whit Smith was elected as the town's first mayor. According to an urban legend, the name was changed because the mayor's wife Martha Jane, who had recently moved to the town, refused to hang her lace curtains in a town named Alligator.

Civil War

During the American Civil War the railroad between Lake City and Jacksonville was used to send beef and salt to Confederate soldiers. In February 1864 Union troops under Truman Seymour advanced west from Jacksonville. His objective was to disrupt Confederate supplies, and obtain African-American recruits and supplies. Confederate General Joseph Finnegan assembled troops and called for reinforcements from P. G. T. Beauregard in response to the Union threat. On February 11, 1864, Finnegan's troops defeated a Union cavalry raid in Lake City. After the Union cavalry was repulsed, Finnegan moved his forces to Olustee Station about ten miles east of Lake City. The Confederate presence at Olustee Station was reinforced to prepare for the Union troops coming from Jacksonville.

Union forces engaged the Confederates at the Battle of Olustee on February 20, 1864, near the Olustee Station. It was the only major battle in Florida during the war. Union casualties were 1,861 men killed, wounded or missing; Confederate casualties were 946 killed, wounded or missing. The Confederate dead were buried in Lake City. In 1928 a memorial for the Battle of Olustee was established in downtown Lake City.

The Civil War badly damaged Florida's railroads, including the Florida, Atlantic and Gulf Central Railroad. The railroad was rebuilt by carpetbagger George William Swepson and was renamed the Florida Central Railroad in 1868. In 1869 the Pensacola and Georgia Railroad was merged with a railroad from Jacksonville to Lake City to form the Jacksonville, Pensacola and Mobile Railroad. In 1874 a fire destroyed most of the wooden buildings in Lake City.

Modern Lake City

In 1874 Lake City's first newspaper was published, called the Lake City Reporter. In 1876 the Bigelow Building was completed; it later was adapted for use as the City Hall. In 1891 Lake City became the first city in Florida to have electric lights from a local power and light company.

By the early 20th century, Lake City had become an important railroad junction, served by the Seaboard Air Line, Atlantic Coast Line, Georgia Southern and Florida Railroad. Hotel Blanche was built in 1902 as an attraction for expected tourists. The hotel was Lake City and Columbia County's major hotel and central business center from 1902 to 1955.

The population of Lake City in 1900 was 4,014; in 1905 was 6,509; and 1910 was 5,032.

Florida Agricultural College was established in 1884 as part of the Morrill Land Grant Act; in 1904 it became a full university with twenty-five instructors. In 1905 the Florida Agricultural College was moved to Gainesville, becoming part of the University of Florida. Columbia High School constructed a second building in 1906 that was used until 1922.

In 1907 Lake City officials leased the former property of the Florida Agricultural College to the Florida Baptist Convention; they founded a Baptist college called Columbia College. Columbia College lasted for ten years until the college became overwhelmed with debt. Columbia College deeded the land and buildings back to Lake City in 1919. During World War I, the campus of Columbia College was used as a training site for local troops for the war. The facility was adapted for use as U.S. Hospital No. 63, the predecessor of the Veterans Hospital constructed in Lake City. More than 34 Lake City soldiers were killed in World War I.

In 1940 the population of Lake City was 5,836. During World War II, a number of institutions were established to help with the war effort as well as those in Lake City. The Lake Shore Hospital was dedicated in 1940 to provide medical care for those in the Lake City area. The Lake City Woman's Club became the United Service Organizations (USO) headquarters to entertain service personnel stationed in Lake City. Naval Air Station Lake City was commissioned in 1942 on the site of the Lake City Flying Club air field. NAS Lake City was a support facility for Naval Air Station Jacksonville and trained pilots to fly the Lockheed Ventura. Military operations at NAS Lake City ended in March 1946, and it was decommissioned as an active naval air station.

After World War II a local air base was converted for use in 1947 as the Columbia Forestry School. The Columbia Forestry School had low enrollments and funds, forcing the school to seek help from the Florida legislature. The University of Florida assumed management of the school, and in 1950 it became the University of Florida Forest Ranger School. As part of the network of community colleges established in Florida, the school became the Lake City Junior College and Forest Ranger School in 1962. Lake City Junior College was renamed to Lake City Community College in 1970; in 2010 it was renamed as Florida Gateway College.

By 1950, the population of Lake City was 7,467. The forestry products industry (turpentine, lumber, and pulpwood) had become a mainstay of the local economy.

During the Korean War, five Lake City soldiers were killed. A monument was dedicated in 1985 in their honor and memory.

In 1958, the Columbia Amateur Radio Society was formed. This was a group of amateur radio operators who enjoyed the ability to communicate all over the world. This radio club still exists today. Lake City's centennial was celebrated in 1959 with parades, fireworks and a 58-page book documenting one hundred years of progress, A Century in the Sun. The citizens of the town dressed in period attire, complete with whiskers. A good-natured clash arose between the men with additional facial hair and the women who did not like it.

In 1963 Interstate 75 and Interstate 10 were opened, intersecting at Lake City. In the 1960s Columbia County schools were not desegregated. In 1970 a judge ordered all Columbia County public schools to integrate. During the Vietnam War, 23 local Lake City soldiers were either killed or M.I.A.

In 1978 the Columbia County Public Library was established. Downtown Lake City was revitalized in the 1990s with new businesses, shops and restaurants. In 2000 Lake City had a population of 9,980.

On 10 June 2019, Lake City was hit by a cyber ransomware attack that rendered many of the city's communication systems inoperable. On 25 June 2019, the City's insurance company, the Florida League of Cities, paid 42 bitcoins—over US$480,000—for a mechanism to retrieve the City's files and data.

Geography

Lake City is located in northern Florida at 30°11′N 82°38′W (30.1896, –82.6397). It lies near the intersection of Interstate 10 and Interstate 75.

Climate

Lake City is part of the humid subtropical climate zone of the Southeastern United States. Due to its latitude and relative position north of Florida's peninsula it is subject at times to continental conditions, which cause rare cold snaps that may affect sensitive winter crops.

Demographics

Lake City first appeared in the 1850 U.S. Census as "Alligator", with a total recorded population of 131. 

As of the census of 2010, there were 12,046 people, 4,650 households, 2558 Family households, residing in the city. The population density was 1002.4 per square mile. The racial makeup of the city was 56.6% White, 37.3% African American, 0.4% Native American, 1.6% Asian, 0.0% Pacific Islander, 0.9% from other races, and 2.7% from two or more races.  5.4% of the population were Hispanic or Latino of any race.

There were 4,650 households, out of which 28.6% had children under the age of 18 living with them, 35.5% were married couples living together, 20.4% had a female householder with no husband present, and 39.9% were non-families. 33.9% of all households were made up of individuals, and 15.8% had someone living alone who was 65 years of age or older. The average household size was 2.34 and the average family size was 3.01.

In the city, the population was spread out, with 25.4% under the age of 18, 9.3% from 18 to 24, 25.1% from 25 to 44, 20.6% from 45 to 64, and 19.7% who were 65 years of age or older. The median age was 37 years. For every 100 females, there were 89.8 males. For every 100 females age 18 and over, there were 85.5 males.

The median income for a household in the city was $28,533, and the median income for a family was $39,133. Males had a median income of $31,261 versus $27,656 for females. The per capita income for the city was $18,083.  20.5% of the population and 17.4% of families were below the poverty line. Out of the total population, 25.9% of those under the age of 18 and 14.0% of those 65 and older were living below the poverty line.

Religion

Around 40% of the people of Lake City are affiliated with a religion. Evangelicalism is the largest religious affiliation with 27.9% followed by Protestant (4.7%), African Protestant (3.5%), Catholicism (2.4%) and other religions (1.6%). 59.8% are not affiliated with a religion.

Mountaintop Ministries Worldwide, formerly End Time Ministries and commonly called End Timers, was established near Lake City by Charles Meade in 1984. The basis of the ministry was that Lake City would be the only place to survive Armageddon and believers were to stay in an underground bunker on Meade's property.

Ancestry/Ethnicity

2016

As of 2016 the largest self-reported ancestry groups in Lake City, Florida are:

Economy

Lake City and Columbia County are known as "The Gateway to Florida" because Interstate 75 runs through them, carrying a large percentage of Florida's tourist and commercial traffic. Lake City is the northernmost sizable town/city in Florida on Interstate 75 and the location where I-10 and I-75 intersect. Interstate 10 is the southernmost east-west major interstate highway and traverses the country from Jacksonville, Florida, to Santa Monica, California. U.S. 41 and U.S. 90 (the U.S. highway versions of I-75 and I-10) have intersected in Lake City since 1927, long before the Interstate highways were built. The city relies on travelers for a considerable part of its economy.

Lake City is the location of the Osceola National Forest's administrative offices.

Since 2000, three companies have begun large operations in Lake City: Hunter Panels, New Millennium and United States Cold Storage. Target built their first company-owned and third-party-operated perishable food distribution center in Lake City in 2008.

In 2011, The top employers in the Lake City area are:

Arts and culture

Olustee Battle Festival

Every February since 1976, Lake City has hosted the Olustee Battle Festival and reenactment of the Battle of Olustee spanning three days. The festival begins with a memorial service at Oak Lawn Cemetery in Lake City to honor those who died from both sides on day one and ends with a reenactment at the Olustee Battlefield Historic State Park on day three. From day one to day three various activities from live entertainment to exhibits are on display in downtown Lake City and the Olustee Battlefield Historic State Park.

Alligator Warrior Festival

The Alligator Warrior Festival is held each year on the weekend of the 3rd Saturday in October to recognize the early history of Columbia County prior to the Civil War. The first Alligator Festival was held in 1995 at Olustee Park in downtown Lake City.

Parks and recreation

Alligator Lake Park
Falling Creek Falls
Olustee Park
Wilson Park
Osceola National Park
Southside Sports Complex
Youngs Park

Government

Lake City is governed by a council/city manager form of government. The city council consists of five members, with four representing four city districts, while the Mayor serves at-large throughout all of Lake City. The administration of Lake City consists of The City Manager's Office, The Assistant City Manager, Human Resources, Procurement, Finance and Technology.

The Lake City Police Department was founded around 1861 during the Civil War. The first fire department was established in 1883 to complement the police department. Argatha Gilmore has been the Chief of Police since 2009 after serving 25 years with the Tallahassee Police Department.

Education

The Columbia County School District operates nine elementary schools, three middle schools, two high schools and an alternative school. Lake City also has one higher education institution, Florida Gateway College, that offers associate degrees and four-year bachelor's degrees.

Infrastructure

Transportation

Airport

The Lake City Gateway Airport is a local center of business. The airport is classified as a general aviation facility, but two on-site operations are somewhat unusual. HAECO (formerly TIMCO) is an aircraft modification and rehabilitation operation for large (B-727, 737 and Airbus A-320 A-319) civilian and military aircraft. The U.S. Forest Service uses C-130 transport aircraft in support of its forest fire-fighting operations in the southeastern United States.

U.S. Highways

 U.S. Route 90
 U.S. Route 41
 U.S. Route 441

Interstate
 Interstate 75
 Interstate 10

Railroad

Lake City was a scheduled stop for Amtrak's Sunset Limited between Los Angeles and Orlando from 1993 to 2005, when damage to railroad lines and bridges by Hurricane Katrina caused the curtailment of all service east of New Orleans,

Freight service is provided by the Florida Gulf & Atlantic Railroad, which acquired most of the former CSX main line from Pensacola to Jacksonville on June 1, 2019.

Notable people

 Brian Allen, NFL linebacker
 Blayne Barber, PGA golf player
 Jerome Carter, NFL safety
 Fred P. Cone, 27th Governor of Florida
 Grace Elizabeth, Model 
 Shayne Edge, former Florida Gators and Pittsburgh Steelers punter
 Yatil Green, NFL wide receiver Miami Dolphins
 Harold Hart, American football player
 Bertram Herlong, bishop, Episcopal Diocese of Tennessee
 Timmy Jernigan, NFL Defensive Tackle
 Michael Kirkman, MLB pitcher, World Series, Texas Rangers
 Kimberly Diane Leach, last victim of serial killer Ted Bundy
 Trey Marshall, NFL safety
 Martha Mier, pianist and composer
 Andrew R. Nicholas, historian
 Dwight Stansel, state representative and farmer
 John Franklin Stewart, MLB, 2nd base
 Pat Summerall, NFL placekicker, television sportscaster
 Jasin Todd, former Shinedown  guitarist
 Laremy Tunsil, NFL offensive lineman
 Reinard Wilson, NFL linebacker
 Chubby Wise, fiddler

References

External links

 City of Lake City official website
 Florida Index, historical newspaper for Lake City, Florida fully and openly available in the Florida Digital Newspaper Library

 
County seats in Florida
Cities in Columbia County, Florida
Micropolitan areas of Florida
Cities in Florida
1830 establishments in Florida Territory
Populated places established in 1830